Rövarspråket is a Swedish language game. It became popular after the books about Bill Bergson by Astrid Lindgren, where the children use it as a code, both at play and in solving actual crimes.

The formula for encoding is simple. Every consonant (spelling matters, not pronunciation) is doubled, and an o is inserted in-between. Vowels are left intact. It is possible to render the Rövarspråket version of an English word as well as a Swedish, such as the following for the word stubborn:

sos-tot-u-bob-bob-o-ror-non or sostotubobboborornon

The code is not very useful in written form, but it can be difficult to decode when spoken by a trained user speaking quickly. For an untrained speaker, a word or phrase can often be something of a tongue-twister or a shibboleth.

Today, the books (and subsequent films) are so well known in Sweden, and also in Norway, that the language is part of the culture of schoolchildren.

See also

Argot
Língua do Pê aka Jeringonza
Pig Latin
Tutnese or Double Dutch, similar rules
Ubbi Dubbi
Javanais
Gibberish

References

Swedish language
Society of Sweden
Language games